Sandusky City School District is a public school district serving students in the city of Sandusky, Ohio, United States. The school district enrolls 3,449 students as of the 2012–2013 academic year.

Schools

Preschools
Hancock Elementary (Preschool)
Mills Elementary (Preschool)

Elementary schools

Hancock Elementary School (Grades K through 6th)
Mills Elementary School (Built 1953) (Grades K through 6th) 
Ontario Elementary School (Grades K through 6th)
 Osborne Elementary School (Grades K through 6th)
Venice Heights Elementary School (Grades K through 6th)
Regional Center for Advanced Academic Studies, RCAAS (Grades 3–6)

Middle schools
Sandusky Middle School (Grades 7-8th)

High schools
Sandusky High School (Grades 9th through 12th)

References

External links
Sandusky City School District website

School districts in Ohio
Education in Erie County, Ohio